The hexatriynyl radical, is an organic radical molecule consisting of a linear chain of six carbon atoms terminated by a hydrogen. The unpaired electron is located at the opposite end to the hydrogen atom, as indicated.  Both experimental work and computer simulations on this species was done in the early 1990s.

Synthesis of the radical 
The radical can be synthesized by photolysis. Two different examples involve
 Argon gas and 1,3-butadiene in a mole ratio of 1500:1
 Argon gas and acetylene in a mole ratio of 100:1

Hexatriyne anion

In 2006 the negatively charged hexatriyne anion of this molecule, C6H−, was the first negatively charged ion to be discovered to exist in the interstellar medium, using the Green Bank Telescope. Negative ions were thought to be unstable in this environment due to the prevalence of ultraviolet light, which dislodges extra electrons such as this.

Synthesis of the anion

The laboratory synthesis starts from acetylene C2H2. The reaction takes place within a DC discharge at reduced pressure in a mixture with 15% argon. The product is observed by millimeter-wave spectroscopy.

Analogous species 

The two species C4H− and C8H− have also been detected.

References

See also
Acetylene
Diacetylene

Alkynes
Free radicals